Duji was a circuit of the Chinese Táng Empire. It was established by Emperor Xuánzōng and covered today's Luòyáng (then Dōngdū / Henan Prefecture [Hénán Fǔ]) and the area around it. Duji Circuit was succeeded by the Sòng Dynasty's Jingxibei Circuit (Jīngxīběi Dào). It contained three prefectures: Dōngdū, Luòzhōu, and Rǔzhōu.

See also 
 Provinces under the Tang dynasty

Circuits of the Tang dynasty
Former circuits in Henan
History of Luoyang
8th-century establishments in China